Barychelidae, also known as brushed trapdoor spiders, is a spider family with about 300 species in 42 genera. Most spiders in this family build trapdoor burrows.

Some species avoid flooding by plugging their burrows, while others can avoid drowning by trapping air bubbles within the hairs covering their bodies. Some members of this group have a rake on the front surface of their chelicerae used for compacting burrow walls. These spiders can run up glass like tarantulas, and some can stridulate, though it isn't audible to humans.

Distribution
Barychelids are found in Australia, New Caledonia, South America, Africa, Madagascar, India, New Guinea, and Pacific islands.

Genera

, the World Spider Catalog accepts the following genera:

Ammonius Thorell, 1899 — Cameroon
Atrophothele Pocock, 1903 — Yemen
Aurecocrypta Raven, 1994 — Australia
Barycheloides Raven, 1994 — New Caledonia
Barychelus Simon, 1889 — New Caledonia
Cosmopelma Simon, 1889 — Brazil
Cyphonisia Simon, 1889 — Africa
Cyrtogrammomma Pocock, 1895 — Guyana
Diplothele O. Pickard-Cambridge, 1891 — Sri Lanka, India
Encyocrypta Simon, 1889 — New Caledonia
Eubrachycercus Pocock, 1897 — Somalia
Fijocrypta Raven, 1994 — Fiji
Idioctis L. Koch, 1874 — Oceania, Africa, Singapore
Idiommata Ausserer, 1871 — Australia
Idiophthalma O. Pickard-Cambridge, 1877 — South America
Mandjelia Raven, 1994 — Australia
Monodontium Kulczyński, 1908 — Singapore, Papua New Guinea, Indonesia
Moruga Raven, 1994 — Australia
Natgeogia Raven, 1994 — New Caledonia
Neodiplothele Mello-Leitão, 1917 — Brazil
Nihoa Raven & Churchill, 1992 — Papua New Guinea, Vanuatu
Orstom Raven, 1994 — New Caledonia
Ozicrypta Raven, 1994 — Australia
Paracenobiopelma Feio, 1952 — Brazil
Pisenor Simon, 1889 — Africa
Plagiobothrus Karsch, 1892 — Sri Lanka
Psalistops Simon, 1889 — Venezuela, Brazil, Costa Rica
Questocrypta Raven, 1994 — New Caledonia
Rhianodes Raven, 1985 — Malaysia, Singapore, Philippines
Sason Simon, 1887 — Asia, Oceania, Seychelles
Sasonichus Pocock, 1900 — India
Seqocrypta Raven, 1994 — Australia
Sipalolasma Simon, 1892 — Asia, Africa
Strophaeus Ausserer, 1875 — Brazil, Peru, Panama
Synothele Simon, 1908 — Australia
Thalerommata Ausserer, 1875 — Colombia, Mexico
Tigidia Simon, 1892 — Madagascar, Mauritius
Trittame L. Koch, 1874 — Australia
Troglothele Fage, 1929 — Cuba
Tungari Raven, 1994 — Australia
Zophorame Raven, 1990 — Australia
Zophoryctes Simon, 1902 — Madagascar

References

 Raven, R.J. (1986): A revision of the spider genus Sason Simon (Sasoninae, Barychelidae, Mygalomorphae) and its historical biogeography. Journal of Arachnology 14: 47-70. PDF
 Valerio, CE. (1986): Mygalomorph spiders in the Barychelidae (Araneae) from Costa Rica. J. Arachnol. 14: 93-99. PDF (Psalistops venadensis, Trichopelma laselva)
 Schwendinger, P.J. (2003): Two new species of the arboreal trapdoor spider genus Sason (Araneae, Barychelidae) from Southeast Asia. Raffles Bulletin of Zoology 51(2): 197-207. PDF (S. sundaicum, S. andamanicum)

External links

 Brush-footed trap-door spiders
 

 
Mygalomorphae families